Horbach is a surname. Notable people with the surname include:

Andrey Horbach (born 1985), Belarusian footballer
Eugene Horbach (1926–2004), American real estate developer
Lance Horbach (born 1958), American politician
Maksim Horbach (born 1983), Belarusian footballer